David Elliot Cohen is an American author and editor who has, over a 30-year span, created more than 70 photography books. He is probably best known for the best-selling Day in the Life and America 24/7 series of photography books that he co-created with Rick Smolan.

Cohen created four New York Times bestsellers: A Day in the Life of America (1986), A Day in the Life of the Soviet Union (1987), Christmas in America (1988), and America 24/7 (2003). His 2009 book, Obama: The Historic Front Pages was a USA Today and Wall Street Journal bestseller. His 2008 book, What Matters combined photo-reportage about essential issues of our time with essays by prominent commentators including Samantha Power, Jeffrey Sachs and Bill McKibben. The Chicago Tribune called the book, "Powerful and passionate."

He also wrote a travelogue, One Year Off (1999), which chronicles a rambling 16-month trip around the world by land, air, and sea with his three children, Kara, William, and Lucas. The San Francisco Chronicle called the book "honest, reflective, and often uproariously funny,".  The New York Times was less flattering, calling it, "a book that proves it is also possible to go almost everywhere and learn almost nothing."

Cohen wrote a second travelogue in 2016, entitled The Wrong Dog. The Pittsburgh Post-Gazette said “Despite the adorable puppy portrait on the cover, the book is more than the story of Simba and the cross-country road trip. It’s a beautifully written memoir... funny, sweet, and sad.”  In 2018 The Wrong Dog won an International Book Award, a National Indie Excellence Award  and an Independent Press Award, all in the animal and pet books category.
 
Cohen was born in Buffalo, New York, grew up in Erie, Pennsylvania. He lived in Manhattan for ten years before moving to Marin County, California. He returned to Manhattan in 2014. He graduated from Yale University in 1977 with a degree in English literature.  His honors include a National Jewish Book Award, the American Jewish Committee's humanitarian award, a Catholic Press Association Award and a silver medal from the king of Spain for the promotion of Spanish tourism. He currently serves on the board of the International Center for Journalists.

Major works

Pro bono works

External links
"Portrait of America: High Tech Photo Book captures scenes of modern life" by Alden Mudge. Book Page Interview", December, 2003.
"A Day in the Life of Africa: A 24-Hour Vision of a Continent" The Globalist, 2002.
"One Year Off Press Release" Traveler's Tales, June, 2001.
"Olympus Partners with America 24-7, The Largest Photography Project in History" Olympus and America 24/7, May, 2003.
"America 24/7: Extraordinary Images of One American Week" by Rick Smolan and David Elliot Cohen. The Digital Journalist, November, 2003.
A Day in the Life of Africa online "A Day in the Life of Africa" Book website

Notes

1955 births
Living people
American male writers
American publishers (people)
Jewish American writers
Yale College alumni
21st-century American Jews